The Thai Ambassador in Lima is the official representative of the Government in Bangkok to the Government of Peru and is concurrently accredited in Bogotá and Quito.

History
From 1969 to  the Thai Ambassador to Brazil was concurrently accredited in Lima.

List of representatives

 Peruvian Ambassador to Thailand

References 

Peru
Thailand